The 1907 Cisleithanian legislative election was held in May 1907 in the Kingdom of Dalmatia in eleven single-seat constituencies by universal male suffrage.

Results

Elected lists and candidates 

Elections in Croatia
1907 elections in Europe
1907 in Croatia
Cisleithanian legislative elections
History of Dalmatia